Hesian was created in the spring of 2006. The music they play is a mix of punk rock, hardcore and a bit of ska style. The most distinctive feature of the group is the contrast of the female and the male voices. The aim of Hesian is to reflect through their lyrics real situations in their lives, including the political conflicts of the Basque Country, love, women´s situation and poverty.

First steps

The music band started in 2006, in a local gig which was in Etxarri-Aranatz, a town which is located in the province of Navarre, Spain. Etxebe (drums), Xabi Seko (bass guitar) and Fran (guitar and voice) were the creators of Hesian. Although all the members of the group had taken part in other music bands, they started singing and playing songs belonging to famous groups like Rancid, Blink 182, No use for a name, Bouncing souls etc.  They thought that it could be a good idea to mix the two different voices, because at that moment that mixture was not very usual. Then, Amets entered the band. After a few weeks, with the aim of giving more strength to Hesian, a new guitar player was added, Erik. The first music band was completed. That summer, they recorded they first song called "Maite dugu".

At the end of the year they recorded the song "Euskal Herriak autodeterminazioa". From the release of that song, they decided to include some air instruments in the group, so Eneko (trumpet), Igotxo (saxophone) and Buton (trombone) got into the music band. As time went by, their role in the group increased until they became an essential part in it .

In June 2007 they recorded they first album known as "Maite dugu" in the K studios of Pamplona.

2007-2010

Before they published their first album, they gave ten concerts in Sakana. From then, to 2009, the number of concerts increased to 115. Although most of the concerts had been given in the Basque Country, they also played in Catalonia and Spain. In October they published their second album "Herriaren oihua".

After a little rest in 2009 and with new members in the band, Karlos with the trombone, Mireia the voice and Xabi with the guitar they recorded their third album in 2010 called "Borrokatu eta irabazi". The title reflects the difficulties they had suffered until they reached their aim, that is, become one of the most popular groups in the Basque Country. 
Nevertheless, they had to make some changes in the group, so as a consequence, they stopped giving concerts for a while. After publishing three albums in four years and giving 150 concerts it was time to take a breath.

2011-Nowadays

In September they decided to continue with the group. Zuriñe and Txamus replaced Mireia and Karlos and they started to work hard. In August they published their fourth album known as "Hitzetik". After that, they recorded another album called "Hemen eta orain" .

Members of the band

Fran (guitar and voice)
Zuriñe (voice)
Bruno (bass guitar)
Danel (drums)
Iker (guitar)
Igotxo (saxophone)
Eneko (trumpet)
Aitor (trombone)

Past members of the band

Xabi S. (bass guitar 2006/2014)
Etxebe (drums 2006/2014)
Buton (trombone 2007/2008)
Erik (guitar 2006/2009)
Amets (voice 2006/2010)
Mireia (voice 2010)
Karlos (trombone 2008/2010)

Discography

Maite dugu 2007
Itsas bazterrean
Maite dugu
Erantzuteko beharra
Behar zaitut
Errealitatea
Euskal Herria autordeterminazioa
Begira nazazu 
Pauso mugatuak
Herriaren oihua 2008
Ez ziren hitzak
Harri bat, doinu bat
Zure itzala
Begi beltz
Esaidazu
Izan genuen ametsa
Inoiz ez
Itzalpeko garraxia
Galduta
Hau dena aldatzera doa
Borrokatu eta irabazi 2010
Itxaropenaren izenean
Agortu dira hitzak
Milaka argi
Ezin ahaztu
Isiltasunaren mugan
Eguna helduko da
Beranduegi da
ikusi dezaket
Itxuaren aroa
Eman eskua
Hemen gaude
Hitzetik 2011
Helmugarik gabe
Noiz itzuliko zara 
Guregaitik
Noraezean
Sua eta bihotza
Argi iluna
Zure bidean
Irribare batekin
Geroa, eroa
Bihotzetik mundura
Olatu berdea

Hemen eta orain 2013
Agortu Dira Hitzak
Noraezean
Ezin Ahaztu
Errealitatea
Zeru Gorriko Egunak
Beste Egun Bat
Kalera Kalera
Milaka Argi

Hegalak astinduz 2014
Irtenbide bat
Non zaude
Akelarreko muxua
Arrazoia eta amorrua
Ez etsi
Kilometrotako gutuna
Beldur gabe
Zu zara, gu gara
Noiz arte
Ametsen memoria
Maite genuena
Zenbat kolpe
Maitasun egarria
Silueta beltzak

Spanish musical groups
Basque music bands